The Greatest Showman: Original Motion Picture Soundtrack is the soundtrack album to the film The Greatest Showman. It was released in full on December 8, 2017, by Atlantic Records. The first pre-order release was on October 26, 2017, with two promotional singles: "The Greatest Show" and "This Is Me". A third, "Rewrite the Stars", followed on November 17, 2017. "This Is Me" was released on December 8, 2017, as the album's official lead single. In Australia, "Rewrite the Stars" was released to radio on July 20, 2018.

Produced by Greg Wells, Justin Paul, and Benj Pasek, the album became a global success following the release of the film, topping the charts in several countries including the United States, Australia, the United Kingdom and Japan. The album also reached number one on iTunes in over 77 countries.<ref>{{cite web|url=https://deadline.com/2018/01/greatest-showman-soundtrack-hits-no-1-itunes-billboard-1202238633/|title=The Greatest Showman' Soundtrack Hits No. 1 On Album Chart & iTunes|date=January 8, 2018|website=Deadline Hollywood|access-date=February 18, 2020|archive-date=October 4, 2018|archive-url=https://web.archive.org/web/20181004130744/https://deadline.com/2018/01/greatest-showman-soundtrack-hits-no-1-itunes-billboard-1202238633/|url-status=live}}</ref> In the United Kingdom, the album was a commercial success and was the best-selling album of 2018. It became only the second album in 30 years to spend 11 consecutive weeks at number 1 and, in its 20th week atop the UK Albums Chart, it became the longest-running soundtrack at number 1 in 50 years. With combined sales of over 1.6 million, it was 2018's best-selling album in the United Kingdom. It was also the best-selling album of 2018 in the United States, with 1,491,000 in pure album sales, but third at 2,499,000 in album equivalent units.

The album's single "This Is Me" won Best Original Song – Motion Picture at the  75th Golden Globe Awards, and was nominated for Best Song at the Critics' Choice Movie Awards and Best Original Song at the 90th Academy Awards. The album received positive reviews and has sold over 5.3 million copies worldwide.
The album also won the Grammy Award for "Best Compilation Soundtrack for Visual Media" at 61st Annual Grammy Awards.

Release
The first pre-order release was on October 26, 2017, with the soundtrack released in full on December 8, 2017, by Atlantic Records.

It debuted at number 71 on Billboard 200, and later stayed at number one for two weeks. On January 7, 2018, the soundtrack had been on the top of the Billboard 200 for two weeks, reaching its top in its fourth week of availability. It had sold 106,000 copies at that point. In its third week, it attained the number two slot. The Greatest Showman beat that week's top album in traditional album sales (70,000 vs. 65,000) and was the top-selling album of the week, but did not top the Billboard 200 due to TEA units and SEA units. As of December 2019, the album have sold over 1,731,000 pure copies in the United States.

By February 7, 2018, the soundtrack was a breakout hit at number 1 on the UK album charts and number 2 in the United States. On February 8, 2018, Stereogum published an article stating that "statistically speaking, The Greatest Showman is by far the most popular album of the year so far."

By February 27, it was the top album on iTunes. By March 23, 2018, it had been the number one in the UK for eleven straight weeks. It had sold 465,000 copies, with around 40% of those sales on CD and vinyl. By April 6, the album climbed back up the charts for its 12th non-consecutive week at number one. , the soundtrack had totalled 28 non-consecutive weeks at number one on the UK official album chart, making it the longest reigning album of the decade, ahead of Adele's 21, which notched 23 weeks at number one.

Critical reception
The album was selected for the 2017 Oprah's Favorite Things list. By February 23, 2018, the track "This Is Me" was nominated for Best Original Song at the 2018 Academy Awards. According to Sky News on March 25, 2018, "music critics have put the album's success down to the feel-good, uplifting pop tunes which are also old school at the same time."

Sheila O'Malley of RogerEbert.com called the 11 songs "memorable," praising the vocal performances of the leads. The women's magazine Bustle gave it a positive review, particularly certain vocal performances. Stereogum described the soundtrack music as eclectic in its influences, giving it a negative reception for "[serving] up earnest buoyancy in many high-fructose flavors." Also noting the eclectic mix of musical genres, The Ringer writes that "the bombastic tunes mix EDM gleams with stadium-rock grunts, chest-pounding ballads with peppy empowerment anthems, a thoroughly modern and disconcertingly eager post-genre assault designed to barnstorm as many Spotify playlists as possible. It's a gilded cheese ball, pushing exhilaration to the point of exhaustion." The Guardian wrote that the album brought "a whole lot of self-empowerment, enlivened with some deracinated R&B beats, and given the necessary gravitas by some power ballads of the sort that make one imagine the singer filmed from below with a wind machine blowing in their face."

Live performances

Keala Settle performed "This Is Me" live on The Graham Norton Show on February 9, 2018. Later she performed it on The Ellen DeGeneres Show on February 21, 2018. She also performed the song at the 90th Academy Awards ceremony on March 4, 2018. She also performed the song on The X Factor in November 2018.

Loren Allred performed "Never Enough" live at "Church by the Glades" on April 16, 2018.

Hugh Jackman opened the 2019 Brit Awards with "The Greatest Show".

Settle performed "This Is Me" again on December 19, 2021 at the Royal Variety Performance.

Accolades

 Track listing 

Notes

Songs' charts and certifications

Notes

Personnel
Credits adapted from the liner notes of The Greatest Showman.

 Soundtrack album producers: Greg Wells, Justin Paul, Benj Pasek
 Soundtrack Album Producers for Atlantic Records: Kevin Weaver and Pete Ganbarg
 All tracks mixed by Greg Wells, except track 7 mixed by Manny Marroquin
 Executive music producer: Alex Lacamoire
 Music producers: Greg Wells, Justin Paul, Benj Pasek, Alex Lacamoire, Adam Gubman, Chris Leon, Ryan Lewis, Ricky Reed, Jake Sinclair, Joseph Trapanese
 Production music supervisors: Benj Pasek & Justin Paul
 Music coordinator: Jordan Carroll
 Music production supervisor: Ethan Popp
 Associate music production supervisor: Jason Michael Webb
 Music supervisor: Mark White
 Supervising musician and vocal contractor: Sandy Park
 Supervising vocal producer: Liz Caplan
 Vocal producers and coaches: Justin Paul, Carmen Key, Patrick Vaccariello
 Vocal arrangements: Justin Paul
 Supervising music editor: Jennifer Monnar
 On set music copyist: Benjamin Lively
 A&R contribution: Brandon Davis
 Marketing for Atlantic Records: David Grant
 Project coordinator for Atlantic Records: Kellie Gentry
 Business and legal affairs for Atlantic Records: Ben Landry
 A&R administration for Atlantic Records: Aryanna Platt
 Art direction for Atlantic Records: Mark Obriski
 Executive in charge of music for Twentieth Century Fox: Danielle Diego
 Music supervised for Twentieth Century Fox: Anton Monsted
 Music production supervised for Twentieth Century Fox: Rebecca Morellato and Brianne Porcaro
 Business affairs for Twentieth Century Fox: Thomas Cavanaugh and Lauren Caruso
 Music clearance for Twentieth Century Fox: Ellen Ginsburg

Charts

Weekly charts

Year-end charts

Decade-end charts

Certifications

The Greatest Showman: ReimaginedThe Greatest Showman: Reimagined'' is a re-recording of the soundtrack, featuring new versions of the original songs now sung by the likes of Pink, Kesha, Kelly Clarkson, and more. The album was released on November 16, 2018.

Singles and promotion

The Kesha version of "This Is Me" was originally released as a non-album single on 22 December 2017, to promote the original soundtrack, but later featured on the soundtrack's re-release. Leading up to the album's release, the songs "A Million Dreams" and "A Million Dreams (Reprise)" performed by P!nk and her daughter Willow Sage Hart respectively, were released  as promotional singles along with the pre-order of the album on October 24, 2018. On November 2, 2018, Panic! at the Disco's cover of "The Greatest Show" was released as second promotional single. On 16 November, the day the soundtrack was released, the video for James Arthur's and Anne-Marie's "Rewrite the Stars" was released.

Track listing

Notes

Songs' charts and certifications

Charts

Weekly charts

Year-end charts

Certifications

Notes

References

2017 soundtrack albums
Atlantic Records soundtracks
2010s film soundtrack albums
Grammy Award for Best Compilation Soundtrack for Visual Media
Various artists albums